The Call Street Historic District is a U.S. historic district (designated as such on December 12, 1985) located in Starke, Florida. It contains 23 historic buildings and 1 structure.

The historic district also serves as the City of Starke's primary restaurant and entertainment district, with a theatre, antique shops, restaurants, a history museum, and cultural center. Located within the historic district is another location on the National Register of Historic Places, the Santa Fe College Andrews Center.

Call Street was named in honor of former Florida territorial governor, Richard K. Call.

References

External links

 
 

Geography of Bradford County, Florida
Historic districts on the National Register of Historic Places in Florida
National Register of Historic Places in Bradford County, Florida